Nowa Wieś Wielka  is a village in Bydgoszcz County, Kuyavian-Pomeranian Voivodeship, in north-central Poland. It is the seat of the gmina (administrative district) called Gmina Nowa Wieś Wielka.

The village has a population of 2,207. Its name means "Great New Village".

References

Villages in Bydgoszcz County